Oliver Holzbecher (born 25 September 1970) is a German former footballer who played as a forward. Holzbecher was a West Germany youth international, and came through the youth team of Hertha BSC. He made his Hertha debut in the last game of the 1988–89 season, coming on as a 75th-minute substitute for Sven Kretschmer in a 1–0 defeat against Fortuna Köln. Over the next few years his appearances were restricted to Hertha's reserve team, where he was part of the team that reached the 1993 DFB-Pokal Final, losing 1–0 against Bayer Leverkusen. This gave him another chance at first-team action, and he made a further nine appearances in the 2. Bundesliga before leaving in 1995. He spent three years in the Regionalliga Nordost with Reinickendorfer Füchse, before playing out his career with an eight-year spell at Spandauer BC, who were renamed FC Spandau 06 in 2003. He retired in 2006.

References

External links
 

1970 births
Living people
German footballers
Germany youth international footballers
Association football forwards
Hertha BSC II players
Hertha BSC players
Füchse Berlin Reinickendorf players
2. Bundesliga players
Footballers from Berlin
West German footballers
SC Staaken players